Jan van Ravenswaay (28 November 1789, Hilversum - 2 March 1869, Hilversum) was a 19th-century landscape painter from the Northern Netherlands. He was born in the town of Hilversum

Biography
Ravenswaay was the son of a cotton mill owner in Hilversum. He studied drawing with Jordanus Hoorn in Amstersfoort, before following lessons from Pieter Gerardus van Os. He traveled in Belgium, Germany and Switzerland before becoming a member of the Royal Academy of Art in Amsterdam. He won an honorable mention for a landscape in a competition at Felix Meritis in 1818. In 1832, Jan became a member of the artist society Arti Sacrum in Rotterdam.

Noteworthy among his pupils were Jacobus Theodorus Abels and Remigius Adrianus Haanen. His niece Adriana van Ravenswaay also became a painter.

Notes

References

External links

Jan van Ravenswaay on Artnet

1789 births
1869 deaths
19th-century Dutch painters
Dutch male painters
People from Hilversum
19th-century Dutch male artists